Zdziechów Nowy  is a village in the administrative district of Gmina Lutomiersk, within Pabianice County, Łódź Voivodeship, in central Poland.

From 1975 to 1998, the town belonged administratively to the Sieradz Voivodship.

As of 2017, the village has a population of roughly 30 people.

References

Villages in Pabianice County